The Kraft Foods Group is an American food manufacturing and processing conglomerate, split from Kraft Foods Inc. in 2012 and headquartered in Chicago, Illinois. It became part of Kraft Heinz in 2015.

A merger with Heinz, arranged by Heinz owners Berkshire Hathaway and 3G Capital, was completed on July 2, 2015, forming The Kraft Heinz Company, the fifth-largest food and beverage company in the world.

History

Spinoff of Kraft Foods Group from Kraft Foods Inc.
In August 2011, Kraft Foods Inc. announced plans to split into two publicly traded companies — a snack food company and a grocery company.

On April 2, 2012, Kraft Foods Inc. announced that it had filed a Form 10 Registration Statement to the SEC to split the company into two companies to serve the "North American grocery business".

On October 1, 2012, Kraft Foods Inc. spun off its North American grocery business to a new company called Kraft Foods Group, Inc. The remainder of Kraft Foods Inc. was renamed Mondelēz International, Inc., and was refocused as an international snack and confection company. Burt P. Flickinger III of Strategic Resource Group said the strategy "worked for Mondelez, but not for Kraft."

On November 19, 2013, an arbitration ruling ordered Starbucks to pay Kraft Foods Inc. $2.7 billion because of an early contract termination. The money would go to Mondelēz International, Inc. In October 2013, Kraft announced that it would remove artificial dyes from three macaroni and cheese varieties made in kid-friendly shapes, but not its plain elbow-shaped Kraft Macaroni and Cheese product with "original flavor". This was in response to a petition by activist Vani Hari and blogger Lisa Leake who delivered a petition to the company to remove controversial synthetic dyes Yellow 5 (labeled as Tartrazine) and Yellow 6 from its signature macaroni and cheese products.

Kraft and Heinz merger
On March 25, 2015, Kraft Foods Group Inc. announced that it would merge with the H.J. Heinz Company, owned by 3G Capital and Berkshire Hathaway Inc. Kraft's shares rose about 17 percent in premarket trading after the announcement of the deal, which will bring Heinz back to the public market following its takeover over two years prior. The companies completed the merger on July 2, 2015.

Sponsorships and promotions
Kraft is an official partner and sponsor of both Major League Soccer and the National Hockey League. Since 2006, Kraft Foods has sponsored Kraft Hockeyville, a reality television series produced by CBC/SRC Sports, in which communities demonstrate their commitment to the sport of ice hockey in a contest revolving around the theme of community spirit. The winning community gets a cash prize dedicated to upgrading their hometown arena, as well as the opportunity to host an NHL preseason game. In 2007, it was then relegated to segments aired during Hockey Night in Canada. In 2015, Kraft Hockeyville was expanded to the United States with a separate competition for communities there.

From 2002 to 2014, Kraft sponsored the Kraft Nabisco Championship, one of the four "majors" on the LPGA tour. The company also sponsored the Kraft Fight Hunger Bowl, a post-season college football bowl game, from 2010 to 2012.

Brands

The company's core businesses are in beverage, cheese, dairy foods, snack foods, and convenience foods. Kraft's major brands include:

 A.1.
 Boca Burger
 Capri Sun (U.S. Licensee)
 Claussen pickles
 Gevalia
 Grey Poupon
 Horsemen
 Jell-O
 Kool-Aid
 Kraft, including Kraft Dinner, Kraft Singles, Kraft Mayo
 Maxwell House
 Oscar Mayer
 Philadelphia Cream Cheese
 RIDG's Finer Foods, licensing name used by Kraft addressing Bull's-Eye Barbecue Sauce
 Seven Seas – salad dressings
 Velveeta

See also
 List of Kraft brands
 List of dairy product companies in the United States
 General Foods
 Ovson Egg

References

External links

 

 
Kraft Heinz

Condiment companies of the United States
Dairy products companies of the United States
Food manufacturers of the United States
Multinational dairy companies
Multinational food companies
Multinational companies headquartered in the United States

American companies established in 2012
Food and drink companies established in 2012
American companies disestablished in 2015
Food and drink companies disestablished in 2015
2012 establishments in Illinois
2015 disestablishments in Illinois
Companies formerly listed on the Nasdaq
American brands
Corporate spin-offs
2015 mergers and acquisitions
Defunct manufacturing companies based in Chicago